The Ministry of Higher and Tertiary Education is a government ministry focused on education in Zimbabwe and is responsible for universities, polytechnics and colleges in Zimbabwe. The incumbent minister is Prof. Amon Murwira. It oversees:
 National Council for Higher Education
 Universities and colleges in Zimbabwe

 See also 
Education in Zimbabwe
 Ministry of Higher Education, Science and Technology (Zimbabwe)

References

Government of Zimbabwe
Education in Zimbabwe
Zimbabwe